This is a list of works addressing the subject or the themes of intelligent design.

Non-fiction

Supportive non-fiction

Supportive non-fiction books

 
 
 Michael J. Behe. Darwin's Black Box: The Biochemical Challenge to Evolution, New York: Free Press, 1996. 
 Michael J. Behe, William A. Dembski, Stephen C. Meyer.  Science and Evidence for Design in the Universe (Proceedings of the Wethersfield Institute), Ignatius Press 2000, 
 Michael J. Behe, The Edge of Evolution, Free Press, June 5, 2007, 
 David Berlinski. The Devil's Delusion: Atheism and its Scientific Pretensions, Basic Books; Reprint edition, 2009, 
 
  (Attacks evolution. Not a support for Creationism.)
 Percival Davis and Dean H. Kenyon Of Pandas and People: The Central Question of Biological Origins 1989 (2nd edition 1993) 
 William A. Dembski. Intelligent Design: The Bridge Between Science & Theology, InterVarsity Press 1999.  
 William A. Dembski, James M. Kushiner. Signs of Intelligence: Understanding Intelligent Design, Brazos Press, 2001, 
 William A. Dembski, John Wilson. Uncommon Dissent: Intellectuals Who Find Darwinism Unconvincing, ISI Press, 2004. 
William A. Dembski and Jonathan Wells, The Design of Life, Foundation for Thought and Ethics, November 19, 2007.
 William A. Dembski, The Design Revolution: Answering the Toughest Questions About Intelligent Design (Foreword by Charles W. Colson). Inter Varsity Press. 2004, 
 William A. Dembski, The Design Inference: Eliminating Chance through Small Probabilities (Cambridge Studies in Probability, Induction and Decision Theory), Cambridge University Press, 2006.
 William A. Dembski, No Free Lunch: Why Specified Complexity Cannot Be Purchased without Intelligence (2007),  
 William A. Dembski, The Design of Life: Discovering Signs of Intelligence in Biological Systems, ISI Distributed Titles; 1st edition (September 5, 2008)
 William A. Dembski and Sean McDowell, Understanding Intelligent Design: Everything You Need to Know in Plain Language
 William A. Dembski, Intelligent Design Uncensored: An Easy-to-Understand Guide to the Controversy, IVP Books, 2010
 Michael Denton. Evolution: A Theory In Crisis, Adler & Adler; 3rd edition, 1986, 
 Michael Denton. Nature's Destiny: How the Laws of Biology Reveal Purpose in the Universe, 2002 
 Michael Pitman. Adam and Evolution, Rider & Co; First Edition, 1984, 
James H. Feldstein, Intelligent Design? 
Antony Flew. There Is a God: How the World's Most Notorious Atheist Changed His Mind, HarperOne, 2008, 
Steve Fuller. Science vs Religion? Intelligent Design and the Problem of Evolution. Polity Books. 2007, .
Steve Fuller. Dissent Over Descent: Evolution's 500-year War on Intelligent Design. Icon Books Ltd. 2008, 
 James Gills. Darwinism Under The Microscope: How recent scientific evidence points to divine design, Charisma House, 2002, 
 Werner Gitt. In the Beginning Was Information: A Scientist Explains the Incredible Design in Nature, Master Books, 2006, 
Guillermo Gonzalez and Jay Richards, The Privileged Planet: How Our Place in the Cosmos is Designed for Discovery Regnery Publishing 2006
Cornelius G. Hunter, (2002). Darwin's God: Evolution and the Problem of Evil, Brazos Press. 
 Phillip E. Johnson. Darwin on Trial, Washington, D.C.: Regnery Gateway,  1991. 
 Phillip E. Johnson. Defeating Darwinism by opening minds, Downers Grove, Ill.: InterVarsity Press, 1997. 
 Phillip E. Johnson. Evolution as dogma: the establishment of naturalism, Dallas, Tex.: Haughton Pub. Co., 1990
 Stephen C. Meyer, Scott Minnich, Jonathan Moneymaker, Paul A. Nelson, and Ralph Seelke, Explore Evolution: The Arguments for and Against Neo-Darwinism, Hill House Publishers Pty. Ltd., Melbourne and London, 2007, .
Stephen C. Meyer. Signature in the Cell: DNA and the Evidence for Intelligent Design. New York: HarperOne (June 23, 2009) 
Stephen C. Meyer. Darwin's Doubt: The Explosive Origin of Animal Life and the Case for Intelligent Design. New York: HarperOne (June 10, 2013) 
 Bradley Monton. Seeking God in Science: An Atheist Defends Intelligent Design, Broadview Press; 1 edition, 2009, 
 J. P. Moreland. The Creation Hypothesis: Scientific Evidence for an Intelligent Designer, IVP Books, 1994, 
 Robert G. Neuhauser. The Cosmic Deity: Where Scientists and Theologians Fear to Tread, Mill Creek Publishers, 2004, 
 Denyse O'Leary, By Design or By Chance? The Growing Controversy on the Origins of Life in the Universe, Augsburg Books, June 2004, 
 Mark Ludwig. Computer Viruses, Artificial Life and Evolution: The Little Black Book of Computer Viruses, Amer Eagle Pubns Inc, 1993, 
 Dean L. Overman, A Case Against Accident and Self-Organization, Rowman & Littlefield Publishers, 1997, 
  Online in full. (pdf of first section)
 
 A.C. Bhaktivedanta Swami Prabhupada. Life Comes From Life, Bhaktivedanta Book Trust  (ID from the Vedic Perspective)
 Rael. Intelligent Design: Message from the Designers, Nova Distribution, 2006, 
 Fazale Rana. The Cell's Design: How Chemistry Reveals the Creator's Artistry, Baker Books, 2008, 
 Hugh Ross. Beyond the Cosmos, Signalman Publishing, 2010, 
 Hugh Ross. Why the Universe is the Way it Is, Grand Rapids, MI: Baker Books, 2008, 
 John C. Sanford. Genetic Entropy and the Mystery of the Genome, Feed My Sheep Foundation, Inc, 2008, 
 Geoffrey Simmons, William Dembski. What Darwin Didn't Know, Harvest House Publishers, 2004, 
 
 Philip Snow. Design and Origin of Birds, Day One Publications, 2006, 
 Lee Strobel. The Case for a Creator, Zondervan, 2004, 
 David Swift. Evolution Under the Microscope, Leighton Academic Press, 2002, 
 Charles Thaxton and Walter Bradley. The Mystery of LIfe's Origin: Reassessing Current Theories, Philosophical Library, January 19, 1984, 
 Thomas E. Woodward. Doubts About Darwin: A History of Intelligent Design, Baker Books, 1993, 
 Thomas E. Woodward.  Darwin Strikes Back (2006),

Supportive non-fiction anthologies
 John Angus Campbell, Stephen C. Meyer ed. Darwinism, Design and Public Education, Michigan State University Press, December 2003, 
Why Are We Still Debating Darwinism? Why Not Teach the Controversy? John Angus Campbell
 PART I—Should Darwinism Be Presented Critically and Comparatively in the Public Schools? Philosophical, Educational, and Legal Issues
Intelligent Design, Darwinism, and the Philosophy of Public Education, John Angus Campbell
 Intelligent Design Theory, Religion, and the Science Curriculum, Warren A. Nord
Teaching the Controversy: Is It Science, Religion, or Speech? David DeWolf, Stephen C. Meyer, and Mark E. DeForrest
PART II—Scientific Critique of Biology Textbooks and Contemporary Evolutionary Theory
The Meanings of Evolution, Stephen C. Meyer and Michael Newton Keas
The Deniable Darwin, David Berlinski
Haeckel's Embryos and Evolution: Setting the Record Straight, Jonathan Wells
 Second Thoughts about Peppered Moths, Jonathan Wells
Where Do We Come From? A Humbling Look at the Biology of Life's Origin, Massimo Pigliucci
Origin of Life and Evolution in Biology Textbooks: A Critique, Gordon C. Mills, Malcolm Lancaster, and Walter L. Bradley
PART III—The Theory of Intelligent Design: A Scientific Alternative to Neo-Darwinian and/or Chemical Evolutionary Theories
 DNA and the Origin of Life: Information, Specification, and Explanation, Stephen C. Meyer
Design in the Details: The Origin of Biomolecular Machines, Michael J. Behe
Homology in Biology: Problem for Naturalistic Science and Prospect for Intelligent Design, Paul Nelson and Jonathan Wells
The Cambrian Explosion: Biology’s Big Bang, Stephen C. Meyer, Marcus Ross, Paul Nelson, and Paul Chien
Reinstating Design within Science, William A. Dembski
PART IV—Critical Responses
The Rhetoric of Intelligent Design: Alternatives for Science and Religion, Celeste Michelle Condit
Intelligent Design and Irreducible Complexity: A Rejoinder, David Depew
Biochemical Complexity: Emergence or Design? Bruce H. Weber
Design Yes, Intelligent No: A Critique of Intelligent Design Theory and Neo-Creationism, Massimo Pigliucci
 On Behalf of the Fool, Michael Ruse
Rhetorical Arguments and Scientific Arguments: Do My Children Have to Listen to More Arguments against Evolution? Eugene Garver
Design? Yes! But Is It Intelligent? William Provine
Creation and Evolution: A Modest Proposal, Alvin Plantinga
Thinking Pedagogically about Design, John Lyne
An Intelligent Person's Guide to Intelligent Design Theory Steve Fuller
 The Rhetorical Problem of Intelligent Design, Phillip E. Johnson
Appendixes
A. U.S. Commission on Civil Rights Hearing: On Curriculum Controversies in Biology, 21 August 1998
B. Helping Schools to Teach Evolution, Donald Kennedy
C. Stratigraphic First Appearance of Phyla-Body Plans
D. Stratigraphic First Appearance of Phyla-Subphyla Body Plans
E. Probability of Other Body Plans Originating in the Cambrian Explosion
 An anthology of papers from the November 1996 conference of the same name, sponsored by Christian Leadership Ministries.
Introduction, William Dembski
Part 1,"Unseating Naturalism," Walter Bradley, Jonathan Wells
Part 2, "Design Theory," Nancy Pearcey, William Dembski, Steve Meyer, Paul Nelson
Part 3, "Biological Design," Michael Behe, Siegfried Scherer, Sigrid Hartwig-Scherer, Jeff Schloss
Part 4, "Philosophy and Design," J.P. Moreland, Del Ratzsch, John Mark Reynolds, Bill Craig
Part 5, "Design in the Universe," Hugh Ross, Robert Kaita, David Berlinski, Robert Newman
Concluding essays, Phillip E. Johnson, Bruce Chapman

Supportive non-fiction papers and articles
 Michael Behe. A Response to Critics of Darwin's Black Box
 William A. Dembski. Becoming a Disciplined Science: Prospects, Pitfalls, and Reality Check for ID
 William A. Dembski. Searching Large Spaces—Displacement and the No Free Lunch Regress

Supportive non-fiction films
The Privileged Planet
Unlocking the Mystery of Life
Expelled: No Intelligence Allowed
Darwin's Dilemma
The Information Enigma
Metamorphosis: The Beauty and Design of Butterflies
Flight: The Genius of Birds
Living Waters: Intelligent Design in the Oceans of the Earth

Neutral non-fiction

Neutral non-fiction books
 David L. Bender (1988). Science and Religion; Opposing Viewpoints.  St. Paul, Minnesota:  Greenhaven Press. 
 Carl Johan Calleman (2009). The Purposeful Universe: How Quantum Theory and Mayan Cosmology Explain the Origin and Evolution of Life. Bear & Company. 
 Michael Corey (2007). The God Hypothesis: Discovering Design in Our Just Right Goldilocks Universe. Rowman & Littlefield Publishers. 
 Paul Davies (2007). Cosmic Jackpot The Goldilocks Enigma: Why is the Universe Just Right for Life?. 
 James Le Fanu (2009). Why Us?: How Science Rediscovered the Mystery of Ourselves. Pantheon. 
 Jerry Fodor and Massimo Piattelli-Palmarini. (2011) What Darwin Got Wrong. Picador; Reprint edition 
James N. Gardner (2003). Biocosm: The New Scientific Theory of Evolution: Intelligent Life Is the Architect of the Universe. Inner Ocean Publishing. 
 Brian Goodwin (2001). How the Leopard Changed its Spots: The Evolution of Complexity. Princeton University Press. 
 Amit Goswami (2008). Creative Evolution: A Physicist's Resolution Between Darwinism and Intelligent Design. Quest Books; 1st Quest Ed edition. 
 George Greenstein (1988). The Symbiotic Universe: Life and mind in the Cosmos. Morrow. 
 Bernard Haisch (2010). The Purpose-Guided Universe: Believing In Einstein, Darwin, and God. New Page Books; 1 edition. 
 Francis Hitching (1983). The Neck of the Giraffe or Where Darwin Went Wrong. Signet. 
Mae-Wan Ho (1984). Beyond Neo-Darwinism: An Introduction to the New Evolutionary Paradigm. Academic Pr. 
 Ervin Laszlo (1987). Evolution: The Grand Synthesis. Shambhala. 

 Albert Low (2008). The Origin of Human Nature: A Zen Buddhist Looks at Evolution. Sussex Academic Pr. 
 Richard Milton (2000). Shattering the Myths of Darwinism. Park Street Press. 
 Norman Macbeth (1971). Darwin Retried. Boston: Harvard Common Press
Johnjoe McFadden (2002). Quantum Evolution: How Physics' Weirdest Theory Explains Life's Biggest Mystery. W. W. Norton and Company. 
 

 Robert G. B. Reid (1985). Evolutionary Theory: The Unfinished Synthesis.  Cornell Univ Pr. 
 Stanley Salthe (2003). Development and Evolution: Complexity and Change in Biology. The MIT Press. 
 James A. Shapiro (2011). Evolution: A View from the 21st Century. 
 Robert Shapiro (1986). Origins; A Skeptic's Guide to the Creation of Life on Earth. New York, N.Y.: Summit
 Lee Spetner (1998). Not by Chance!: Shattering the Modern Theory of Evolution. Judaica Press. 
 David Stove (2006). Darwinian Fairytales: Selfish Genes, Errors of Heredity and Other Fables of Evolution. 
 Gordon Rattray Taylor (1984). The Great Evolution Mystery. Publisher Abacus. 
 Duane Thurman (1978).  How To Think About Evolution. Downers Grove, Illinois: The InterVarsity Press. 
 Hubert Yockey (2011). Information Theory, Evolution, and The Origin of Life. Cambridge University Press; Reissue edition.

Neutral non-fiction anthologies
 Robert Pennock ed. Intelligent Design Creationism and its Critics: Philosophical, Theological, and Scientific Perspectives, MIT Press (2002). 

Intelligent Design Creationism's "Wedge Strategy"
 The Wedge at Work: How Intelligent Design Creationism is Wedging Its Way into the Cultural and Academic Mainstream, by Barbara Forrest
 Johnson's Critique of Evolutionary Naturalism
 Evolution as Dogma: The Establishment of Naturalism, by Phillip E. Johnson
 Naturalism, Evidence and Creationism: The Case of Phillip Johnson, by Robert T. Pennock
 Response to Pennock by Phillip E. Johnson
 Reply: Johnson's Reason in the Balance, by Robert T. Pennock
 A Theological Conflict?: Evolution vs. the Bible
 When Faith and Reason Clash: Evolution and the Bible, by Alvin Plantinga
 When Faith and Reason Cooperate, by Howard J. Van Till
 Plantinga's Defense of Special Creation, by Ernan McMullin
 Evolution, Neutrality, and Antecedent Probability: A Reply to McMullin and Van Till, by Alvin Plantinga
 Intelligent Design's Scientific Claims
 Molecular Machines: Experimental Support for the Design Inference, by Michael J. Behe
 Born Again Creationism, by Philip Kitcher
 Biology Remystified: The Scientific Claims of the New Creationists, by Matthew J. Brauer & Daniel R. Brumbaugh
 Plantinga's Critique of Naturalism & Evolution
 Methodological Naturalism?, by Alvin Plantinga
 Methodological Naturalism Under Attack, by Michael Ruse
 Plantinga's Case Against Naturalistic Epistemology, by Evan Fales
 Plantinga's Probability Arguments Against Evolutionary Naturalism, by Branden Fitelson & Elliott Sober
 Intelligent Design Creationism vs. Theistic Evolutionism
 Creator or "Blind Watchmaker?", by Phillip E. Johnson
Phillip Johnson on Trial: A Critique of His Critique of Darwin, by Nancey Murphy
 Welcoming the 'Disguised Friend' – Darwinism and Divinity, by Arthur Peacocke
 The Creation: Intelligently Designed or Optimally Equipped?, by Howard J. Van Till
 Is Theism Compatible with Evolution?, by Roy Clouser
 Intelligent Design and Information
 Is Genetic Information Irreducible?, by Phillip E. Johnson
 Reply to Phillip Johnson, by Richard Dawkins
 Reply to Johnson, by George C. Williams
 Intelligent Design as a Theory of Information, by William A. Dembski
 Information and the Argument from Design, by Peter Godfrey-Smith
 How Not to Detect Design, by Branden Fitelson, Christopher Stephens & Elliott Sober
 The 'Information Challenge', by Richard Dawkins
 Intelligent Design Theorists Turn the Tables
 Who's Got the Magic?, by William A. Dembski
 The Wizards of ID: Reply to Dembski, by Robert T. Pennock
 The Panda's Peculiar Thumb, by Stephen Jay Gould
 The Role of Theology in Current Evolutionary Reasoning, by Paul A. Nelson
 Appealing to Ignorance Behind the Cloak of Ambiguity, by Kelly C. Smith
 Nonoverlapping Magisteria, by Stephen Jay Gould
 Creationism and Education
 Why Creationism Should Not Be Taught in the Public Schools, by Robert T. Pennock
 Creation and Evolution: A Modest Proposal, by Alvin Plantinga
 Reply to Plantinga's 'Modest Proposal', by Robert T. Pennock
 Michael Ruse and William Dembski (eds) Debating Design. New York: Cambridge University Press, (pp. 130 – 148, 2004)
Introduction: general introduction, by William Dembski and Michael Ruse
The argument from design: a brief history Michael Ruse
 Who's afraid of ID?: a survey of the intelligent design movement Angus Menuge
 Part I. Darwinism:
1 Design without a designer: Darwin's greatest discovery Francisco J. Ayala
2 The flagellum unspun: the collapse of 'irreducible complexity' Kenneth Miller
3 The design argument Elliott Sober
4 DNA by design? Stephen Meyer and the return of the god hypothesis Robert T. Pennock
Part II. Complex Self-Organization:
5. Prolegomenon to a general biology Stuart Kauffman
 6. Darwinism, design and complex systems dynamics David Depew and Bruce Weber
 7. Emergent complexity, teleology, and the arrow of time Paul Davies
 8. The emergence of biological value James Barham
Part III. Theistic Evolution:
9. Darwin, design and divine providence John Haught
 10. The inbuilt potentiality of creation John Polkinghorne
 11. Theistic evolution Keith Ward
 12. Intelligent design: some geological, historical and theological questions Michael Roberts
 13. The argument from laws of nature reassessed Richard Swinburne
 Part IV. Intelligent Design:
14. The logical underpinnings of intelligent design William Dembski
 15. Information, entropy and the origin of life Walter Bradley
 16. Irreducible complexity: obstacle to darwinian evolution Michael Behe
 17. The cambrian information explosion: evidence for intelligent design, Stephen Meyer.

Neutral non-fiction papers and articles
 Ankerberg, John. Increasing doubts about evolution (lists scientists who are not ID advocates who oppose Darwinism).
 Bird, Wendell R.  The Yale Law Journal, Vol. 87, No. 3, Jan, 1978
 Bird, Wendell R. "Freedom From Establishment and Unneutrality in Public School Instruction and Religious School Regulation."  Harvard Journal of Law and Public Policy, Vol. 2, June 1979, pp. 125–205
 

 Burian, Richard. Challenges to the Evolutionary Synthesis Virginia Polytechnic Institute and State University
 Edward Goldsmith. Evolution, neo-Darwinism and the paradigm of science  The Ecologist Vol. 20 No. 2, March–April 1990

 
 
 Richard Milton. Neo-Darwinism: time to reconsider Times Higher Education Supplement, 1995
 Staune, Jean. Darwinism Design and Purpose: A European Perspective Institutional Affiliation: General Secretary, Université Interdiciplinare de Paris

Critical non-fiction

Critical non-fiction books
 
 
 
 Richard Dawkins. The Blind Watchmaker: Why the Evidence of Evolution Reveals a Universe Without Design,  W. W. Norton & Company (1996).  
 Richard Dawkins. The God Delusion, Houghton Mifflin (October 18, 2006). 
 Richard Dawkins. The Greatest Show on Earth: The Evidence for Evolution (2009) 
 Barbara Forrest and Paul R. Gross. Creationism's Trojan Horse: The Wedge of Intelligent Design, Oxford University Press (2004). 
 
 
 Ernst Mayr. One Long Argument: Charles Darwin and the Genesis of Modern Evolutionary Thought, Harvard University Press (1993). 
 Kenneth R. Miller. Finding Darwin's God, HarperCollins (1999). 
 National Academy of Sciences. Science and Creationism, National Academies Press (1999). 
 Chris Mooney. The Republican War on Science, Basic Books (2005). 
 Robert Pennock. Tower of Babel: The Evidence against the New Creationism, MIT Press (1999). 
 Mark Perakh. Unintelligent Design, Prometheus (Dec 2003). 
 Andrew J. Petto (Editor), Laurie R. Godfrey (Editor). Scientists Confront Intelligent Design and Creationism, W. W. Norton (2007). 
 Massimo Pigliucci. Denying Evolution: Creationism, Scientism, and the Nature of Science, Sinauer Associates, Incorporated (2002). 
 Michael Shermer, Why Darwin Matters: The Case Against Intelligent Design (2007). 
 Niall Shanks. God, the Devil, and Darwin: A Critique of Intelligent Design Theory, Oxford University Press (2004). 
 Robyn Williams. Unintelligent Design, Why God isn't as smart as she thinks she is, Allen & Unwin (2006).  
 Matt Young, Taner Edis eds. Why Intelligent Design Fails: A Scientific Critique of the New Creationism, Rutgers University Press (2004). 
 Joan Roughgarden Evolution and Christian Faith: Reflections of an Evolutionary Biologist Island Press (August 1, 2006) 
 Francis Collins The Language of God Free Press (July 17, 2007)

Critical non-fiction anthologies

 Foreword by Bill Nye the Science Guy
 1. The Once and Future Intelligent Design, by Eugenie C. Scott
 2. Analyzing "Critical Analysis", by Nicholas J. Matzke and Paul R. Gross
 3. Theology, Religion, and Intelligent Design, by Martinez Hewlett and Ted Peters
 4. From the Classroom to the Courtroom: Intelligent Design and the Constitution, by Jay D. Wexler
 5 When the Classroom Door Closes, Who Teaches Evolution?, by Brian Alters
 6 Defending the Teaching of Evolution, by Glenn Branch and the staff of the National Center for Science Education
 Afterword by Rev. Barry W. Lynn

Critical non-fiction papers and articles
 
 
 
 
 
 Frederick C. Crews. Saving Us from Darwin, The New York Review of Books, Vol 48, No 15 (4 October 2001).
 Frederick C. Crews. Saving Us from Darwin, Part II, The New York Review of Books, Vol 48, No 16 (18 October 2001).
 
 

 
 
 
 
 
 
 
 
 Robert Pennock. DNA by Design?: Stephen Meyer and the Return of the God Hypothesis. In Ruse, Michael and William Dembski (eds) Debating Design. New York: Cambridge University Press, (pp. 130 – 148, 2004)
 Robert Pennock. Critique of Philip Johnson. In Parsons, Keith (ed.) The Science Wars: Debating Scientific Knowledge and Technology. Prometheus Press. (pp. 277–306, 2003)
 Robert Pennock. Creationism and Intelligent Design. Annual Review of Genomics and Human Genetics. (Vol. 4: 143-163, Sept. 2003)
 Robert Pennock. Should Creationism be Taught in the Public Schools? Science & Education (Vol.11 no.2, March 2002, pp. 111–133)
 Robert Pennock. Whose God? What Science? Reply to Michael Behe. In Reports of the National Center for Science Education. (Vol. 21 No. 3-4 pp. 16–19, May-Aug. 2001)
 Robert Pennock. Lions and Tigers and APES, Oh My!: Creationism vs. Evolution in Kansas. Science Teaching & The Search for Origin: Kansas Teach-In. AAAS Dialogue on Science and Religion. (2000)
 Robert Pennock. The Wizards of ID: Reply to Dembski. Metanexus (No. 089, Oct. 11, 2000)
 Robert Pennock. Of Design and Deception: Kansas, Conflict & Creationism. Science & Spirit (Nov./Dec. 1999)
 Robert Pennock. Untitled—Reply to Phillip Johnson re: Tower of Babel. Books and Culture (Sept./Oct. 1999)
 Robert Pennock. The Prospects for a Theistic Science. Perspectives on Science and Christian Faith (Vol. 50, No. 3, pp. 205–209, Sept. 1998)
 Robert Pennock. Creationism's War on Science. Environmental Review (Vol. 5, No. 2, pp. 7 – 16, February 1998)
 Robert Pennock. Naturalism, Creationism and the Meaning of Life: The Case of Phillip Johnson Revisited. Creation/Evolution (Vol. 16, No. 2, pp. 10–30, Winter 1996)
 Robert Pennock. Reply to Johnson - Johnson's Reason in the Balance. Biology & Philosophy (Vol. 11, No. 4, pp. 565–568, 1996)
 Robert Pennock. Naturalism, Evidence and Creationism: The Case of Phillip Johnson. Biology and Philosophy (Vol. 11, No. 4, pp. 543–559, 1996)

Critical non-fiction films
Flock of Dodos A biting, tongue-in-cheek documentary that pans both sides of the debate.
Judgement Day: Intelligent Design on Trial, a Public Broadcasting Service NOVA television documentary about the Kitzmiller v. Dover federal trial
A War on Science is a 49-minute BBC Horizon television documentary about intelligent design, including the 2005 Kitzmiller v. Dover court battle. It prominently features Oxford University professor, biologist Richard Dawkins. It was first broadcast on 26 January 2006. Intelligent design supporters and promoters Phillip Johnson, Michael Behe, Stephen C. Meyer and William A. Dembski also appear in the documentary.

Fiction
The concept of life having been designed or manipulated is a staple of science fiction. Aspects of Intelligent Design are explored in:

Calculating God by Robert J. Sawyer. 2000.  A science fiction novel in which an intelligent designer is manipulating reality solely for the benefit of human-kind and three other sentient species residing in our galaxy.
2001: A Space Odyssey; in the movie, human evolution is accelerated and guided by an unspecified force, assumed by many to be aliens. In the novel based on the film, human evolution is accelerated and guided by aliens.
In the Doctor Who episode Image of the Fendahl, evolution on Earth was guided by an alien, to allow it to feed on humans.
The novel Frankenstein, or the Modern Prometheus prominently features an intelligently (but imperfectly) designed creature, whose faults stem from the inherent flaws of its creator, Victor Frankenstein.
The Hitchhiker's Guide to the Galaxy reveals that the Earth was built by the Magratheans who were commissioned by mice and designed by the computer Deep Thought to find the ultimate question of life, the universe, and everything.
In the movie Mission to Mars, highly evolved aliens accelerated and guided human evolution.
Rama Revealed by Arthur C. Clarke and Gentry Lee; in this final novel of a series, it is revealed that the (mostly offstage) Ramans create universes and test their inhabitants in an attempt to maximise the quantity of consciousness within them.
According to the Star Trek: The Next Generation episode "The Chase", Star Trek aliens all look similar because life was seeded on different planets by highly evolved aliens.
In the Well World series, by Jack L. Chalker, aliens known as Markovians evolved and grew to the point where their computers, by means of a universal mathematics, were able to create/produce/do anything they wanted.  Bored with being virtual gods, they decided their race had been flawed in some manner.  So they designed a new universe and Markovian volunteers chose to become all of the new races therein, including humans, to see if perhaps another race could attain the perfection they believed existed but which they themselves failed to achieve.
 
 References the mathematical calculation of the improbability of life.
"Surface Tension" is a 1952 science fiction short story by James Blish. A human colonization ship crash-lands and they genetically engineer their descendants into something that can survive. They create a race of microscopic aquatic humanoids and metal plates of knowledge for them. Blish coined the term pantropy to refer to this concept, as opposed to terraforming.
"Microcosmic God" is a 1941 science fiction novelette by Theodore Sturgeon. A scientist develops a synthetic life form, which he calls "Neoterics", that live at a greatly accelerated rate and produce many generations over a short time so he can use their inventions. The scientist asserts his authority by killing half the population whenever they disobey his "divine" orders.
Prometheus is a 2012 science fiction film that follows the journey of the Earth spaceship Prometheus as it follows an ancient star map which takes them to humanity's creators or "Engineers".

See also
List of creation myths
List of god video games
Artificial life: Notable simulators
Life simulation game
Shaggy God story

References

Intelligent design
 
Lists of controversial books
Religious bibliographies
Pseudoscience-related lists